Oxford Tower is the 39th-tallest structure in Toronto, located at 130 Adelaide Street West. It was completed in 1979. The building is named after its landlord, Oxford Properties and is part of the Richmond-Adelaide Centre. The building is measured at 137 metres above street level. It has 33 above-ground storeys and is attached to Toronto's underground PATH system.

References 

Skyscrapers in Toronto
Office buildings completed in 1979
Oxford Properties
Skyscraper office buildings in Canada

WZMH Architects buildings